Valaliky is a relatively new village and municipality in Košice-okolie District in the Kosice Region of eastern Slovakia.

History
In the municipality was only established in 1961.

Geography
The village lies at an altitude of 190 metres and covers an area of 8.625 km². The municipality has a population of about 4000 people.
Originally, the earliest documents mentioning this village of about 3 890 inhabitants are from 14th century.

External links
  Valaliky website (in Slovak only)
 
  Table tennis club in Valaliky (Stolnotenisový oddiel Valaliky)

 

Villages and municipalities in Košice-okolie District